The George Washington Birthplace National Monument is a national monument in Westmoreland County, Virginia, at the confluence of Popes Creek and the Potomac River. It commemorates the birthplace location of George Washington, a Founding Father and the first President of the United States, who was born here on February 22, 1732. Washington lived at the residence until age three and later returned to live there as a teenager.

History

17th–18th centuries
John Washington, George Washington's great-grandfather, settled this plantation in 1657 at the original property on Bridges Creek. The family acquired expanded land to the south toward nearby Popes Creek.

Prior to 1718, the first section of the house was built. His father enlarged it between 1722–1726. He added on to it by the mid-1770s, making a ten-room house known as "Wakefield". This house, which George Washington in 1792 would describe as "the ancient mansion seat," was destroyed by fire and flood on Christmas Day 1779, and never rebuilt.

George Washington was born in the house on February 22, 1732. Thirty-two graves of Washington family members have been found at the Bridges Creek cemetery plot, including George's half-brother, father, grandfather, and great-grandfather.

Washington's father cultivated tobacco on his several plantations, as his ancestors had done.

19th century
In 1858, the Commonwealth of Virginia acquired the property to preserve the homesite and cemetery. In 1882, however, Virginia donated the land to the federal government following the Civil War.

20th century
The Wakefield National Memorial Association was formed in 1923 to restore the property. In 1930, the grounds were authorized by Congress as a U.S. National Monument.

Since the exact appearance of the original Washington family home is not known, a Memorial House was designed by Edward Donn, Jr., representing similar buildings of the era; it was constructed on the approximate site in 1931. The actual location of Washington's boyhood home is adjacent to the memorial house and its foundation is outlined in the ground by crushed oyster shells.

The Memorial House represents a typical tobacco plantation of the period of the original's construction. The Memorial House is constructed of bricks handmade from local clay. It has a central hallway and four rooms on each floor, furnished in the 1730–1750 period style by the Wakefield National Memorial Association. Furnishings include an 18th-century tea table believed to have been in the original house. Most of the other furnishings are more than 200 years old. At the entrance to the grounds, now maintained and operated by the National Park Service, is a Memorial Shaft obelisk of Vermont marble; it is a one-tenth scale replica of the Washington Monument in Washington, D.C.

The park and Memorial House were opened by the National Park Service in 1932, on the 200th anniversary of George Washington's birth.

21st century 

In the 21st century, the Monument is part of the National Park Service's ongoing efforts to interpret historical resources. In addition to the Memorial House, park facilities open to visitors include the historic birthplace home area, Kitchen House, hiking trails, and picnic grounds. In the Kitchen House, costumed re-enactors demonstrate candle- and soap-making.

A colonial herb and flower garden has been planted with herbs and flowers common to Washington's time, including thyme, sage, basil, and flowers such as hollyhocks, forget-me-nots, and roses. Typical trees and bushes of Washington's time have also been added to the landscaping. The Colonial Living Farm has a barn and pasture and raises livestock, poultry, and crops that were typical in the 18th century and using farming methods that were common at the time.

Visitors may also tour the Washington family Burial Ground, which contains the graves of 32 members of the Washington family, including George Washington's father, grandfather, and great-grandfather. Replicas of two original gravestones are visible, along with five memorial tablets placed here in the 1930s.

The Visitors' Center contains artifacts recovered from the burned-down Washington house, including a bowl, clay figurine, wine bottle seal belonging to Augustine Washington, wine bottle, and keyhole plate.

A 15-minute film depicting Washington family life is shown in a theater at the Visitors' Center.

Directions

It can be reached via VA Route 204, the access road to the site from VA State Route 3.

See also
 List of national monuments of the United States
 Northern Neck George Washington Birthplace AVA
 Washington's Birthday
 Montross, Virginia
 Stratford Hall Plantation
 State Route 204, the access road to the site from State Route 3

References

 Gary W. Ferris (1999), Presidential Places

External links

 George Washington Birthplace National Monument official website
Wakefield, State Route 204, Wakefield Corner, Westmoreland County, VA: 15 photos, 3 data pages, and 2 photo caption pages at Historic American Buildings Survey, Library of Congress
Wakefield, Kitchen, State Route 204, Wakefield Corner, Westmoreland County, VA: 7 photos and 1 photo caption page at Historic American Buildings Survey
Wakefield, Gardens & Grounds, State Route 204, Wakefield Corner, Westmoreland County, VA: 2 photos at Historic American Buildings Survey
Video showing several places at this site from 2016

George Washington Birthplace National Monument
Historic American Buildings Survey in Virginia
Presidential homes in the United States
Washington family residences
George Washington Birthplace National Monument
George Washington Birthplace National Monument
Plantations in Virginia
Presidential museums in Virginia
Georgian architecture in Virginia
Houses in Westmoreland County, Virginia
National Register of Historic Places in Westmoreland County, Virginia
Houses on the National Register of Historic Places in Virginia
Protected areas established in 1930
1930 establishments in Virginia
Rebuilt buildings and structures in Virginia
Birthplaces of individual people
Burned houses in the United States
Monuments and memorials to George Washington in the United States
Tobacco plantations in the United States
Homes of United States Founding Fathers